Alphadon (meaning "first tooth") is an extinct genus of small, primitive mammal that was a member of the metatherians, a group of mammals that includes modern-day marsupials. Its fossils were first discovered and named by George Gaylord Simpson in 1929.

Description

Not much is known about the appearance of Alphadon, as it is only known from teeth, a lower jaw and skull fragments. Judging from its teeth, it was likely an omnivore, feeding on fruits, invertebrates and possibly small vertebrates. Alphadon had a very good sense of smell and sight to track down its food, both during the day and night. Its possible whiskers could have also aided in its search for food.

Taxonomy and classification

	
The type species is Alphadon marshi. Eight other species are known.
The species Alphadon jasoni was originally described by Storer (1991); it was subsequently transferred to the herpetotheriid genus Nortedelphys.

Recent phylogenetic studies group it with other northern non-marsupial metatherians such as Albertatherium and Turgidodon. A 2016 phylogenetic analysis is shown below.

References 

Prehistoric metatherians
Late Cretaceous mammals of North America
Hell Creek fauna
Milk River Formation
Fossil taxa described in 1927